van den Hende or Vandenhende is a surname. Notable people with the surname include:

Flavie Van den Hende (1865–1925), Belgian cellist
Hans van den Hende (born 1964), Dutch Roman Catholic bishop
Séverine Vandenhende (born 1974), French judoka

Surnames of Dutch origin